Richard Rothwell may refer to:
 Richard Rothwell (painter), Irish portrait and genre painter
 Sir Richard Rothwell, 1st Baronet, English member of parliament
 Richard Pennefather Rothwell, Canadian-American civil, mechanical and mining engineer